Odontoglossum constrictum, the constricted odontoglossum, is a species of orchid found from Colombia to northern Venezuela.

Description and habitat
Odontoglossum constrictum is a medium-sized flower measuring 3.75 centimeters with yellow brown sepals. The plant thrives in cool temperatures at an elevation of 1800–2300 meters above sea level.

constrictum